Qeshquneh-ye Olya (also Romanized as Qeshqūneh-ye ‘Olyā; also known as Qeshqeneh-ye ‘Olyā) is a village in Mangur-e Sharqi Rural District, Khalifan District, Mahabad County, West Azerbaijan Province, Iran. At the 2006 census, its population was 62, in 6 families.

References 

Populated places in Mahabad County